In Australian Aboriginal mythology , Wala is a sun goddess who lived with her sister, Bara, and her sister-in-law, Madalait.  Bara accompanied her across the Sun every day, but Wala realized she made the Earth too hot and made her stop.  She journeyed to the southern mountains and brought back the Sun.  She then stored it in a bag and kept it until the Moon disappeared.

See also
List of solar deities

References

Australian Aboriginal goddesses
Solar goddesses